Thursday is a 1998 American black comedy crime-thriller film written and directed by Skip Woods and starring Thomas Jane, Aaron Eckhart, Paula Marshall, Michael Jeter and Mickey Rourke. It won the Special Jury Prize at the Cognac Festival.

Plot
On Monday night, Nick, Dallas, and Billy Hill argue with a Los Angeles convenience store cashier, resulting in Dallas shooting her dead. They conceal the killing from a police officer until he sees blood on the floor, at which point they kill him.

Early Thursday morning, in Texas, Casey receives a call from his old drug dealing partner Nick asking to stay a couple of days. Since they parted ways several years previously, Casey has cleaned up, married, and is hoping to adopt a child. Nick borrows Casey's car, and Casey finds Nick's suitcase to be full of heroin. Furious, he calls Nick and gives an ultimatum in which Nick either leaves or Casey calls the cops. Nick promises he'll be along once he has finished some business. Casey puts the heroin down his garbage disposal unit.

At 11:55, Casey answers the door to hitman Ice. Casey asks that they smoke some ganja together before he dies, then takes advantage of a distraction. Ice ends up gagged and bound in Casey's garage just as Dr. Jarvis, the adoption agent, rings the doorbell. Casey, stoned, rushes to clear away the drug paraphernalia before letting Jarvis in to discuss his suitability to adopt. Jarvis expresses curiosity about what Casey did when he lived in Los Angeles, as there is no account of his time there. Casey tries his best to cover up his past as well as his recent encounter with Ice.

During the interview, Dallas shows up at Casey's house, believing that Nick has left some money with Casey along with the heroin. She scares Jarvis away by telling a story about Casey's criminal past. When left alone with Casey, Dallas questions him about the money. Angry that he cannot help her, she decides to kill him, but not before she ties him to a chair, fellates him to force an erection, then proceeds to rape him. Dallas says she will not kill Casey until he orgasms and plans to continue until he does so. She orgasms multiple times, but gets no results from Casey. While Dallas reaches a third orgasm, Billy breaks in and shoots her.

Billy believes Casey when told that he has not taken the heroin, but plans on torturing him anyway with a saw and a blowtorch. Billy is interrupted by cops raiding the house next door. As Billy is distracted, Casey is able to loosen the tape around his wrists and grabs a frying pan before he sits back down. When Billy returns, Casey catches him off guard, overpowers him, and leaves him in the garage.

Nick calls Casey from a payphone, apologizes for everything, and admits he had stolen the heroin and money from the police. After he hangs up, it is revealed that Nick has been shot and is dying from blood loss. Finally, corrupt cop Kasarov arrives with a bag which contains Nick's head. He gives Casey until 7 p.m. to find the money, but says that he does not care about the heroin. Upon seeing Dallas's body and Ice and Billy in the garage, Kasarov unloads his gun into the latter two. He tells Casey to throw them out, as it is garbage day.

Casey calls Ice's boss and tells him that the heroin is being auctioned off at 7 p.m. at his house, setting up a gun battle between a Jamaican gang and Kasarov's corrupt cops. Casey recalls Nick's earlier words, which lead him to find the money and a wedding present in the spare tire of his car. He takes them, puts them in Dallas's Lamborghini, and leaves to pick his wife up at the airport.

Cast
 Thomas Jane as Casey Wells
 Aaron Eckhart as Nick
 Paulina Porizkova as Dallas
 James LeGros as Billy Hill
 Paula Marshall as Christine
 Michael Jeter as Dr. Jarvis
 Glenn Plummer as Ice
 Mickey Rourke as Detective Kasarov
 Shawn Michael Howard as Jimmy
 Gary Dourdan as Lester "Ball-peen" James
 Luck Hari as Cashier
 Bari K. Willerford as Cop
 Brian Hooks as Jary

Critical response
Thursday received mixed reviews from the critics. Roger Ebert of the Chicago Sun-Times detested both the film and the director, dismissing it as "a series of geek-show sequences in which characters are tortured, raped, murdered and dismembered in between passages of sexist and racist language", and stating that "watching it, I felt outrage. I saw a movie so reprehensible I couldn't rationalize it using the standard critical language about style, genre, or irony. The people associated with it should be ashamed of themselves." On Rotten Tomatoes it has a 43% approval rating, based on 7 reviews.

Awards and nominations

At the Cognac Festival du Film Policier the film won the 1999 Special Jury Prize (tied with A Simple Plan).

It was nominated for an Artios Award in the category of Best Casting of an Independent Feature Film.

References

External links
 
 
 Thursday trailer at NY Times

1998 films
PolyGram Filmed Entertainment films
1998 crime thriller films
1990s black comedy films
American black comedy films
American crime thriller films
Films with screenplays by Skip Woods
1998 directorial debut films
1998 comedy films
1990s English-language films
1990s American films